The 2015–16 Pacific Tigers women's basketball team will represent the University of the Pacific during the 2015–16 NCAA Division I women's basketball season. The Tigers are led by first year head coach Bradley Davis. They play their home games at Alex G. Spanos Center and were members of the West Coast Conference. They finished the season 13–17, 6–12 in WCC play to finish in a tie for seventh place. They lost in the first round of the WCC women's tournament to Pepperdine.

Roster

Schedule 

|-
!colspan=9 style="background:#FF7F00; color:#000000;"| Exhibition

|-
!colspan=9 style="background:#FF7F00; color:#000000;"| Non-conference regular season

|-
!colspan=9 style="background:#FF7F00; color:#000000;"| WCC regular season

|-
!colspan=9 style="background:#FF7F00;"| WCC Women's Tournament

Rankings

See also 
2015–16 Pacific Tigers men's basketball team

References 

Pacific Tigers women's basketball seasons
Pacific